The 1947 Prince Edward Island general election was held in the Canadian province of Prince Edward Island on December 11, 1947.

The governing Liberals of Premier J. Walter Jones were able to increase their majority in the Legislature over the opposition Progressive Conservatives, led by former Premier William J.P. MacMillan. This would be MacMillan's last election as PC leader.

The democratic socialist Co-operative Commonwealth Federation increased their share of the vote marginally, but were unable to capture any seats. Cyrus Gallant, the CCF's candidate for Assembleyman in 3rd Prince, made history as the first third party candidate to place second in an electoral contest over one of the two major party candidates.

Party Standings

Members Elected

The Legislature of Prince Edward Island had two levels of membership from 1893 to 1996 - Assemblymen and Councillors. This was a holdover from when the Island had a bicameral legislature, the General Assembly and the Legislative Council.

In 1893, the Legislative Council was abolished and had its membership merged with the Assembly, though the two titles remained separate and were elected by different electoral franchises. Assembleymen were elected by all eligible voters of within a district, while Councillors were only elected by landowners within a district.

Kings

Queens

Prince

Sources

1947 elections in Canada
Elections in Prince Edward Island
1947 in Prince Edward Island
December 1947 events in Canada